The Canadair CL-66 was a turboprop version of the civilian Convair CV-440 Metropolitan. The CC-109 Cosmopolitan or "Cosmo" in RCAF service became the standard VIP aircraft as well as replacing the Douglas Dakota and the North American B-25 Mitchell in light transport duties. After a lengthy career stretching into the 1990s, the CC-109 was replaced by the CC-142 Dash 8 and CC-144 Challenger.

Design and development
With the close of production of the Convair CV-440 in San Diego, Canadair acquired the rights to the design along with the jigs, tooling and even three unsold 440s. With the availability of a Napier Eland turboprop conversion, the re-engined CV-440s became the CV-540, an all-cargo variant.

In 1958, the RCAF wanted to replace their aging C-47 Dakotas with a turbine-powered aircraft. Their choice was the Vickers Viscount, but the Canadian government decided against this aircraft. Instead, Canadair offered a series of CV-540 variants powered by Napier Eland turboprops. The project was given the number CL-66 and three versions were considered. The CL-66A was to be a 48/64 passenger aircraft. The CL-66B designed to be a cargo/passenger configuration with a payload of 14200 lb.  The CL-66C used the Convair-built CV-440s, having only their new engines fitted at Canadair.

The first CL-66 to fly was a "C" version with its first flight in February 1959; the CL-66B had its first flight in January 1960. No "A" versions were built.

Operational history

Canadair was not able to get contracts from any major airline for the CL-66.  It was too expensive and other similar types had better performance. The two aircraft, both of them CL-66Cs, that had been used for extensive sales demonstrations, were sold to the local carrier Quebecair. The RCAF took ten aircraft, mainly Bs. The Eland not only proved to be unreliable, but also did not deliver the expected power, consequently, the RCAF instituted an engine upgrade in 1966–1967, installing Allison 501-D36 engines. After eight airframes had been re-engined, the company phased out further development work on the type, "orphaning" the remaining final two Eland examples, which were subsequently scrapped.

No. 412 Squadron at CFB Ottawa (S), or "Uplands"  flew the "Cosmo", from 1960 to 1994 as VIP transport. The Cosmopolitan aircraft were also deployed to Europe for Canadian NATO contingent support as well as to the US in support of Canadian NORAD operations.

Operators

Military

 Royal Canadian Air Force
 Canadian Armed Forces
 used at CFB Lahr in support for Canadian operations for NATO and NORAD in Europe

Specifications (CL-66 – Eland)

See also

References
Notes

Bibliography

 Molson, Ken M. and Harold A. Taylor. Canadian Aircraft Since 1909. Stittsville, Ontario: Canada's Wings, Inc., 1982. .
 Pickler, Ron and Larry Milberry. Canadair: The First 50 Years. Toronto: CANAV Books, 1995. .
 Taylor, John W. R. Jane's All The World's Aircraft 1961–62. London: Sampson Low, Marston & Company, 1961.

External links

 CC-109 Cosmopolitan in RCAF service

CC-109
1960s Canadian military transport aircraft
Low-wing aircraft
Aircraft first flown in 1959
Twin-turboprop tractor aircraft